Jerotej Račanin (c. 1650 – after 1727) was a Serbian writer and transcriber of church manuscripts and books. After visiting Jerusalem in 1704 he wrote a book about his travel experiences from Hungary to the Holy Land and back.

Biography
At the time of the Great Turkish War in the last quarter of the seventeenth century, the Rača monastery was devastated. The Turks several times carried out reprisals against the monks of Rača for engaging in educational activities and promoting Serbian culture, copying church manuscripts and books. Eventually, the monks were forced to take their manuscripts and books with them and with Arsenije III Čarnojević join in the Christian forces in northern Serbia at Zenta, and settled in the uninhabited regions bordering Hungary and deeper inland. They moved to the new regions and resumed their work at Szentendre, near Budapest, and assumed as their surname the name of their former monastery. Among the several who distinguished themselves as monk-scribes and illuminators of old manuscripts were Jerotej Račanin, Hristifor Račanin, Kiprijan Račanin, Gavril Stefanović Venclović, Simeon Račanin, Čirjak Račanin, Teodor Račanin and many others. 
 
From Szentendre, Jerotej Račanin settled at Velika Remeta, a cultural center of the Serbs in the 16th and the 17th centuries, and the home of a manuscript and book copying and illuminating school. Here Jerotej, who lived in this monastery in 1721, wrote "A Journey to Jerusalem", the first travel book in modern Serbian literature.

See also
Gavrilo Stefanović Venclović
Čirjak Račanin (1660–1731), Serbian Orthodox monk and writer
Kiprijan Račanin (1650–1730), Serbian Orthodox monk and writer
Teodor Račanin (1500–1560), Serbian Orthodox monk and writer
Simeon Račanin ( 1676–1700), Serbian Orthodox monk and writer
Hristifor Račanin (1595–1670), Serbian Orthodox monk and writer
Prohor Račanin, Serbian Orthodox monk
Grigorije Račanin ( 1739), Serbian writer
 Jefrem Janković Tetovac

References

Sources
 Translated and adapted from Jovan Skerlić's  Istorija nove srpske književnosti (Belgrade, 1914, 1921), pages 27–28

1650s births
1720s deaths
18th-century Serbian writers
Serbian travel writers
Habsburg Serbs
Refugees of the Great Turkish War